Peder Hjermann (1 December 1754 –  25 December 1834) was a farmer and elected official who served as a representative at the Norwegian Constitutional Assembly.

Peder (Per) Pedersson Hjermann was born in Lærdal in Sogn og Fjordane.  He was youngest of seven siblings born to the sheriff in the village. In adulthood, he  became a farmer at the Stødno farm at Hauge parish in Lærdal. He also served as one of the  Settlement Commissioners (Forlikskommissær)  from the time the  Conciliation Board (Forliksråd ) was introduced in  rural areas in 1797 until 1813.

Peder Hjermann represented Nordre Bergenhus amt (now Sogn og Fjordane) at the Norwegian Constituent Assembly at Eidsvoll in 1814 together with Lars Johannes Irgens and   Niels Nielsen. All three representatives  supported the independence party  (Selvstendighetspartiet).

References

External links
Representantene på Eidsvoll 1814 (Cappelen Damm AS)
 Men of Eidsvoll (eidsvollsmenn)
Memorial stone of Peder Hjermann

Related Reading
 Holme Jørn (2014) De kom fra alle kanter - Eidsvollsmennene og deres hus  (Oslo: Cappelen Damm) 

1754 births
1834 deaths
People from Lærdal
Norwegian farmers
Sogn og Fjordane politicians
Fathers of the Constitution of Norway